Begoña Ameztoy (born 1951) is a Spanish 
writer and painter. She started as a writer, but her interest in arts made her combine literature with cultural movements in Euskadi.

She has worked as a columnist in El Diario Vasco of Donostia since 1992. She has written scripts for TVE programs, and she has worked as a script editor for several TV programs including Crónicas marcianas.

Bibliography
El Círculo (1991) 
El Asesino de Baltimore (1994) 
El Derby Vasco -with Juanjo Valero- (1996) 
El Ángel (2000) 
Escuela de Mujeres (2001) 
Cuarentonas (2002) 
Amor Caliente, Sexo Frío (2007) 
El Sueño de Orión (2010)

Expositions
 2001 - Luz Azul  
 2005 - Cielos y Tierras. Galería Espacio Arte - San Sebastián
 2006 - Retratos. Centro Cultural Clara Campoamor. Bilbao
 2008 - Retratos - Galería Noventa Grados. San Sebastián
 2009 - Cielos de Praga - Galería Gaudí. Madrid
 2011 - Geometria del Verde - Espacio Echevarria - San Sebastián
 2012 - La Vía Láctea -  Galería Pedro Usabiaga - San Sebastián 
 2012 - La Vía Láctea - Feria de Arte de Medinaceli. Soria

References

Living people
Basque women writers
Basque painters
20th-century Spanish writers
21st-century Spanish writers
20th-century Spanish painters
21st-century Spanish painters
1951 births
Spanish women columnists
Spanish dramatists and playwrights
20th-century Spanish women writers
21st-century Spanish women writers
Spanish women painters